Ernest Carol Park is a former professional American football player who played offensive lineman for the San Diego Chargers, Miami Dolphins, Denver Broncos, and Cincinnati Bengals.

References

1940 births
American football offensive linemen
San Diego Chargers players
Miami Dolphins players
Denver Broncos (AFL) players
Cincinnati Bengals players
Living people
American Football League players